Thizica was a civitas in the Roman province of Africa Proconsularis. It served as a Roman Catholic diocese. The city's ruins are located at present-day Techga or Tchegga in northern Tunisia.

Bishopric 
The names of two early bishops of the see are known:
Novellus (mentioned by Saint Augustine of Hippo as condemned to death by Donatists (heretics) in 313)
Vitalia (mentioned in 646)

The modern use of the diocese as a titular see began in 1967. There have been four bishops since that time:
 Edwin Broderick (March 1967 – March 1969)
 Alfonso Nava Carreón (May 1969 – March 1990)
 Edwin Frederick O'Brien (February 1996 – March 1998)
 Louis Dicaire (February 1999 – July 2020)

Of these, O'Brien held the personal title of archbishop.

References

Sources and external links
 Harnack, 89-96
 (Titular See) Thizicensis

Catholic titular sees in Africa